was a Japanese sprinter. He competed in the men's 4 × 100 metres relay at the 1928 Summer Olympics.

References

1907 births
1973 deaths
Athletes (track and field) at the 1928 Summer Olympics
Japanese male sprinters
Olympic athletes of Japan
Place of birth missing
20th-century Japanese people